Thomas Robson (born 11 September 1995) is an English footballer who plays as a defender for Scottish Championship club Queens Park.

Career

Sunderland
Robson began his career with local side Sunderland and progressed through the youth teams at the Stadium of Light and made his Premier League debut on 15 May 2016 in a 2–2 draw away at Watford. Robson had a short spell on loan at League of Ireland Premier Division side Limerick.

Falkirk
In December 2017, Robson agreed to join Scottish Championship side Falkirk from 1 January 2018 on an initial six-month contract. On 19 May 2018, Robson agreed a one-year extension with Falkirk.

Partick Thistle
Following Falkirk's relegation, Robson left the club in the summer of 2019 and subsequently signed for Partick Thistle on a one-year deal.
Robson scored his first goal for The Jags in his second appearance. by opening the scoring in a 2–1 win over Queens Park in the Scottish League Cup group stages.

Queens Park

On 27 August 2020, Robson signed for Queens Park.

Career statistics

References

External links

1995 births
Living people
English footballers
Footballers from Tyne and Wear
League of Ireland players
Premier League players
Sunderland A.F.C. players
Limerick F.C. players
Falkirk F.C. players
Association football defenders
Partick Thistle F.C. players
Queen's Park F.C. players
English expatriate footballers
English expatriate sportspeople in Ireland
Expatriate association footballers in the Republic of Ireland
People from Stanley, County Durham